Tom Felleghy (born Tamás Fellegi; 26 November 1921) is a Hungarian-born Italian actor. He appeared in more than one hundred films since 1958.

Filmography

References

External links 

1921 births
Possibly living people
Hungarian male film actors
Hungarian emigrants to Italy